Warren Zevon is the second studio album by American musician Warren Zevon. This album was recorded in 1975 and released on May 10, 1976, by Asylum Records. A remastered version of the album with bonus tracks was released in 2008 by Rhino Records.

Critical reception 
Reviewing in Christgau's Record Guide: Rock Albums of the Seventies (1981), Robert Christgau wrote: "I am suspicious of singer-songwriters who draw attention to phrases like 'hasten down the wind,' and I would suggest a moratorium on songs about the James Brothers that don't also rhyme 'pollution' and 'solution.' But I like the way Zevon resists pigeonholes like 'country-rock' while avoiding both the banal and the mystagogical, and I like quatrains like: 'And if California slides into the ocean/Like the mystics and statistics say it will/I predict this motel will be standing/Until I pay my bill.'"

Track listing
All songs written by Warren Zevon.

Personnel
Warren Zevon – harmonica, piano, rhythm guitar, string arrangements, vocals
Jackson Browne – harmony vocals on tracks 2, 3 & 11, piano on track 10, slide guitar on track 3
Lindsey Buckingham – guitar on track 3, harmony vocals on tracks 5 & 7
Rosemary Butler – harmony vocals on track 10
Jorge Calderón – harmony vocals on tracks 8 & 11
Marty David – bass guitar on track 3
Ned Doheny – guitar on track 10
Phil Everly – harmony vocals on tracks 1 & 4
Glenn Frey – rhythm guitar on track 9, harmony vocals on tracks 6 & 9
The Gentlemen Boys – background vocals on track 11
Bob Glaub – bass guitar on tracks 1, 2, 4 – 7 & 9 – 11
Don Henley – harmony vocals on track 6
Billy Hinsche – harmony vocals on track 11
Bobby Keys – saxophone on tracks 5, 7 & 10
David Lindley – banjo on track 1, fiddle on tracks 1, 2 & 5, slide guitar on tracks 4 & 7, guitar on track 9
Gary Mallaber – drums on tracks 3 & 8
Roy Marinell – bass guitar on track 8
Stevie Nicks – vocals on track 7 & 10
Bonnie Raitt – harmony vocals on track 10
Fritz Richmond – jug on track 8
Sid Sharp – strings on tracks 4, 6 & 11
J.D. Souther – harmony vocals on tracks 2 & 11
Waddy Wachtel – guitar, vocals
Carl Wilson – harmony vocals on track 11, vocal arrangements
Jai Winding – piano on track 5, organ & synthesizer on track 10, vocals on track 11
Larry Zack – drums on tracks 1, 2, 4 – 7 & 9 – 11
The Gentlemen Boys consisted of: Jackson Browne, Jorge Calderón, Kenny Edwards, J. D. Souther and Waddy Wachtel.

Production
Producer: Jackson Browne
Engineer: Fritz Richmond
Mixing: John Haeny
Arranger: Warren Zevon
Vocal Arrangement: Carl Wilson

Charts

References

Warren Zevon albums
1976 albums
Asylum Records albums
Albums with cover art by Jimmy Wachtel
Albums recorded at Sunset Sound Recorders